Gentilly is a commune in the southern suburbs of Paris, France.

Name
The name Gentilly was recorded for the first time in the 6th century as Gentilly, a royal estate of some importance where coinage was minted. The etymology of the name seems to be "estate of Gentilius", a Gallo-Roman landowner. However, some other researchers think that the name is connected with Latin gentilis (meaning "gentile", "pagan", "foreigner") in reference to foreign goldsmiths who may have settled in Gentilly in the Early Middle Ages.

History
On 1 January 1860, the city of Paris was enlarged by annexing neighboring communes. On that occasion, about half of the commune of Gentilly was annexed to Paris, and forms now the neighborhoods of Maison-Blanche and Glacière, in the 13th arrondissement of Paris.

On 13 December 1896, about half of the remaining territory of Gentilly was detached and became the commune of Le Kremlin-Bicêtre, leaving Gentilly with about a quarter of its pre-1860 area.

Culture
The photographer Robert Doisneau was born in Gentilly (14 April 1912). There is a Maison de la photographie Robert Doisneau  an international cultural center for humanist photography.

Transport
Gentilly is served by Gentilly station on Paris RER line .

Population

Education
Gentilly is served by:
Four preschools: Jean Lurcat, Lamartine, Henri Barbusse, Victor Hugo, and Marie et Pierre Curie
Four elementary schools: Lamartine, Henri Barbusse, Victor Hugo, and Gustave Courbet
One junior high school: Collège Rosa Parks
Two senior high schools:
Lycée professionnel du Val-de-Bièvre
Lycée intercommunal Darius Milhaud which is in Le Kremlin-Bicêtre

Notable residents

 St. Eligius, also known as Éloi de Noyon or Saint Éloi (c. 588 - 1 December 660) is the patron saint of goldsmiths, metalworkers, coin collectors, horses, and those who work with them.
 Saint Martial, third-century monk and first bishop of Limoges.
 Pepin the Short (Pépin le Bref), eighth-century king of the Franks, son of Charles Martel, and father of Charlemagne.
 Blanche of Castile (1188–1252) is said to have owned a castle in Gentilly, the remains of which, chiefly underground vaults, still exist.
 Isaac de Benserade, author and playwright of the seventeenth century, lived in Gentilly and died there in 1691.
 Jacques Chapelle chemist and potter, director of the pottery works at Sceaux from 1748 to 1763, was born at Gentilly in 1721.
 Robert Doisneau, the photographer, was born at Gentilly in 1912.
 Sophie Marceau, the movie actress, born in 1966, lived in Gentilly.
 Raymond Gentilly.

See also
Communes of the Val-de-Marne department
Georges Saupique. Église du Sacré-Coeur sculptor

References

External links

Official website 

Communes of Val-de-Marne